Salvadori's fig parrot (Psittaculirostris salvadorii) is a species of parrot in the family Psittaculidae endemic to the northern part of the Papua province in Indonesia.

Its name is in honour of Italian zoologist and ornithologist Tommaso Salvadori.

Description
These birds are sexually dimorphic. The male of the species has an orange breast patch and yellow cheeks, while the female has a pale blue breast patch and greenish-yellow cheeks. The juveniles of the species all resemble females until adult plumage begins to grow in.

Diet
Salvadori's fig parrot is a frugivore; the diet consists mainly of figs and other fruit.

References

External links
  Loriinae.com - Species Profile
 World Parrot Trust Parrot Encyclopedia - Species Profiles
  - YouTube video of a captive pet Fig Parrot with a scissor beak deformity.

Salvadori's fig parrot
Birds of Western New Guinea
Salvadori's fig parrot
Taxonomy articles created by Polbot